Saraswoti Youth Club is a Nepali football club from the Koteshwor neighborhood of Kathmandu that competes in the Martyr's Memorial B-Division League. They play at the Dasarath Rangasala Stadium, which has a capacity of 25,000 spectators.

League finishes
The season-by-season performance of Saraswoti Youth Club:

Honours

National 

 Martyr's Memorial B-Division League:
 Champions:   2006, 2008-2009

Notes

References

Football clubs in Nepal